is a railway station in the city of Yatomi, Aichi Prefecture, Japan , operated by the private railway operator  Kintetsu .

Lines

Station layout
The station has two island platforms connected by a footbridge. Entrances are located on the south and the north, on the Kuwana side.  The station has automated ticket machines, Manaca automated turnstiles and is staffed.

Platforms

Adjacent stations

Station history
Kintetsu-Yatomi Station was opened on June 26, 1938 as  a station on the Kansai Kyuko Electric Railway, which was acquired by the Sangū Express Electric Railway on January 1, 1940. The station was renamed  at that time, but reverted to its original name on March 13, 1941. The name was shortened to the present name on March 1, 1970. With the new station building was completed in September 1994.

Passenger statistics
In fiscal 2018, the station was used by an average of 11,423 passengers daily.

Surrounding area
Yatomi City Hall

See also
 List of Railway Stations in Japan

References

External links

 Official web page 

Railway stations in Japan opened in 1938
Railway stations in Aichi Prefecture
Stations of Kintetsu Railway
Yatomi, Aichi